The Sandweiler German war cemetery is a World War II cemetery in Sandweiler, in southern Luxembourg. It contains the graves of 10,913 German servicemen from the Battle of the Bulge in winter 1944 and spring 1945.

Following an agreement reached in 1952 between the Grand Duchy of Luxembourg and the Federal Republic of Germany, 5,286 bodies were moved to Sandweiler from 150 different cemeteries throughout Luxembourg.  They had mostly lain in mass graves for which only incomplete records were available and the German War Graves Commission (Volksbund Deutsche Kriegsgräberfürsorge) set about identifying as many as possible.  As a result, 4,014 of the 4,829 in the communal comrades' graves are now identified and listed.

Planning for the cemetery began in May 1952, and it was inaugurated on 5 June 1955, ten years after the end of the war.  The ceremonial opening took place in the presence of more than 2,000 relatives of the dead, whom the Volksbund had brought to Sandweiler in special trains.  With them came also delegations of school children from every German federal state.

In 2005, a special ceremony attended by civil and military representatives from Luxembourg and Germany as well as members of youth groups, took place to commemorate the 50th anniversary of the inauguration of the cemetery.

The last remains interred were those of an unknown German soldier discovered in the forests of Schumann's Eck near Wiltz in late 2007.

Footnotes

External links

 War cemeteries on the Luxembourg-German border
 Webpage on the cemetery in German, with photos
 

German military cemetery
German military cemetery
German military cemetery
Germany–Luxembourg relations
German military cemetery
German War Graves Commission
1955 establishments in Luxembourg
World War II cemeteries